Hsieh Shu-ting (born January 2, 1981) is a Taiwanese former swimmer, who specialized in freestyle and butterfly events. She represented Chinese Taipei in two editions of the Olympic Games (1996 and 2000), and later captured a bronze medal in the 4 × 200 m freestyle relay (8:18.92) at the 1998 Asian Games in Bangkok, Thailand.

Hsieh made her first Chinese Taipei team, as a 15-year-old teen, at the 1996 Summer Olympics in Atlanta. She failed to reach the top 16 final in the 100 m butterfly, finishing in thirty-seventh place at 1:04.39. A member of the Chinese Taipei squad, she placed nineteenth in the 4 × 200 m freestyle relay (8:27.61), and twenty-fourth in the 4 × 100 m medley relay (4:38.90).

At the 2000 Summer Olympics in Sydney, Hsieh drastically shortened her program on her second Olympic appearance, swimming only in the 100 m butterfly. She achieved a FINA B-cut of 1:03.25 from the National University Games in Taipei. Swimming in heat two, she pulled away from the rest of the field by more than half a second (0.50) to a top seed, from start to finish, in a sterling time of 1:03.52. Hsieh's effortless triumph was not enough to put her through to the semifinals, as she placed forty-first overall on the first day of prelims.

References

Notes

1981 births
Living people
Taiwanese female butterfly swimmers
Olympic swimmers of Taiwan
Swimmers at the 1996 Summer Olympics
Swimmers at the 2000 Summer Olympics
Taiwanese female freestyle swimmers
Sportspeople from Taipei
Swimmers at the 1998 Asian Games
Asian Games competitors for Chinese Taipei
20th-century Taiwanese women